Christopher Drake Heinz (born 1973) is an American businessman and investment manager. He is an heir to the billionaire fortune to the family food company Heinz.

Family
Chris Heinz is the youngest son of United States Senator Henry John Heinz III (d. 1991) and Teresa Heinz Kerry. He is the great-great-grandson of the industrialist and founder of the H.J. Heinz Co. He has two brothers, H. John Heinz IV (born 4 November 1966) and Andre Heinz. He and his brothers served on the board of The Heinz Endowments chaired by their mother. His father was killed in the 1991 mid-air collision of a helicopter and plane (Merion air disaster).

Chris Heinz is a stepson of former U.S. Secretary of State and former presidential candidate John Kerry, and stepbrother of Alexandra Kerry and Vanessa Kerry. Heinz married Alexandra Lewis in February 2007. They have two children.

Career
In 2004 when his stepfather John Kerry, was the Democratic nominee for president of the United States,  Heinz quit his job working as a venture capitalist to work as a fundraiser and surrogate speaker for Kerry’s campaign. Heinz worked on his stepfather's Presidential campaign, and spoke at the 2004 Democratic National Convention where he was considered a plausible candidate for a 2006 seat in the U.S. Congress. In 2005, he co-founded Rosemont Capital (named for the family’s Fox Chapel property near Pittsburgh) until departing in 2014. He was a partner in the Washington, D.C. firm Rosemont Seneca from its founding in 2009 until 2014, when he ended his working relationship with Hunter Biden, after Biden took a board position on Burisma Holdings (a Ukrainian fracking gas company), which was owned by Ukrainian oligarch Mykola Zlochevsky, the former Minister of Ecology and Natural Resources. In 2015, he relocated to Pittsburgh.

He has served on the board of the Navy SEAL Foundation. He is a former member of the Council on Foreign Relations.

References

1973 births
Yale University alumni
Harvard Business School alumni
Businesspeople from Pittsburgh
Businesspeople from Washington, D.C.
Heinz family
Living people